Victoria Municipality may refer to:

Colombia
 Victoria, Caldas

Mexico
Victoria Municipality, Guanajuato
Victoria Municipality, Tamaulipas

Honduras
 Victoria, Yoro

See also
Victoria (disambiguation)

Municipality name disambiguation pages